Robert Archibald Prentice (4 July 1917 – June 1987) was an Australian long-distance runner who competed in the 1952 Summer Olympics.

References

1917 births
1987 deaths
Australian male long-distance runners
Olympic athletes of Australia
Athletes (track and field) at the 1952 Summer Olympics
Commonwealth Games competitors for Australia
Athletes (track and field) at the 1950 British Empire Games
20th-century Australian people